Victor Jay Garber,  (born March 16, 1949) is a Canadian-American actor and singer. Known for his work on stage and screen, he has been nominated for three Gemini Awards, four Tony Awards, and six Primetime Emmy Awards. In 2022, he was made an Officer of the Order of Canada.

Garber originated roles in the Broadway productions of Sweeney Todd: The Demon Barber of Fleet Street in 1979, Noises Off in 1983, Lend Me a Tenor in 1989, Arcadia in 1995 and Art in 1998. He's received four Tony Award nominations for his performances in the play Deathtrap in 1978, the Neil Simon musical Little Me in 1982, the comedic play Lend Me a Tenor in 1989 and the musical comedy revival of Damn Yankees in 1994. 

He made his film debut as Jesus Christ in the musical Godspell (1973). He has also been nominated for three Screen Actors Guild Awards along with the casts of the critically acclaimed films Titanic (1997), Milk (2008), and Argo (2012) winning for the latter. Other notable films include Sleepless in Seattle (1993), The First Wives Club (1996), Legally Blonde (2001), Sicario (2015), Dark Waters (2019), and Happiest Season (2020).

On television, Garber is best known as Jack Bristow in the ABC series Alias (2001 to 2006) for which he received three consecutive Primetime Emmy Award for Outstanding Supporting Actor in a Drama Series nominations. He received further Emmy nominations for his portrayal of Sidney Luft in Life with Judy Garland: Me and My Shadows (2001) and for his guest roles in the sitcoms Frasier in 2001 and Will & Grace in 2005. He has since joined the Arrowverse appearing as Martin Stein / Firestorm in the superhero series The Flash (2015–2017) and Legends of Tomorrow (2016–2017).

Early life
Garber was born in London, Ontario, Canada, and is of Russian-Jewish descent. His father was Joseph "Joe" Garber (died 1995), and his mother, Bessie Hope Wolf (died 2005), was an actress, singer, and the host of At Home with Hope Garber. He has a brother, Nathan, and a sister, Alisa.

Garber began acting at the age of nine in 1958, and studied at the University of Toronto's Hart House at age 16. He attended Ryerson Elementary School and London Central Secondary School. He also was enrolled in the children's program of the Grand Theatre; and, at age 16, he was accepted at a six-week summer theatre training program at the University of Toronto taught by Robert Gill. In New York, he studied acting at HB Studio.

Career

Music
In 1967, after a period working as a solo folk singer, he formed a folk group called The Sugar Shoppe with Peter Mann, Laurie Hood and Lee Harris. The group enjoyed moderate success, breaking into the Canadian Top 40 with a version of Bobby Gimby's song "Canada" (1967). Three other Sugar Shoppe songs made the lower reaches of the Canadian Top 100 in 1967 and '68. The band had performed on The Ed Sullivan Show and The Tonight Show Starring Johnny Carson before breaking up.

Theatre
He played Jesus in Toronto's 1972 production of Godspell, alongside Eugene Levy, Andrea Martin, Gilda Radner, Dave Thomas, Paul Shaffer and Martin Short. In 1985 he appeared in Noises Off at the Ahmanson Theatre in Los Angeles.

He appeared on Broadway in the original productions of Deathtrap, Sweeney Todd and Noises Off (1983), and in the original Off-Broadway cast of Assassins, as well as the 1990s revival of Damn Yankees. In 1986, Garber appeared at Circle in the Square opposite Uta Hagen in You Never Can Tell. He has been nominated for four Tony Awards and opened the Tony Awards program in 1994 (the year he was nominated for the Tony Award for Damn Yankees). In 1998, he co-starred on Broadway in the Tony Award-winning play Art with Alan Alda and Alfred Molina. In 2005, he played the role of Frederic in the Los Angeles Opera production of A Little Night Music. He played Ben in a critically praised Encores! staged concert production of Follies (2007) opposite Donna Murphy. In mid-2007, he played Garry Essendine in a production of Noël Coward's Present Laughter at Boston's Huntington Theatre. He reprised the role on Broadway in the Roundabout Theatre production, which opened in January 2010.

In January 2018, Garber replaced David Hyde Pierce as Horace Vandergelder in the Tony-winning Broadway revival of Hello, Dolly! at the Shubert Theatre opposite Bernadette Peters. Garber began performances on January 20 prior to the press opening on February 22.

Garber received the 2018 Theatre World John Willis Award for Lifetime Achievement.

Film

His earlier film work includes Godspell (1973) as Jesus (the part he played originally in the 1972 Canadian stage production), Sleepless in Seattle (1993).  In James Cameron's Titanic (1997) he essayed a Mid-Ulster accent to play the shipbuilder Thomas Andrews. Other movie appearances include  Annie (1999), Legally Blonde (2001), and Tuck Everlasting (2002). In 2009, he took on the role of the DC Comics supervillain Sinestro in the direct-to-video animated film Green Lantern: First Flight. The same year, Garber played a Klingon interrogator in J. J. Abrams' Star Trek film; however, his scenes were deleted from the finished film.  He starred opposite Goldie Hawn, Diane Keaton, and Bette Midler in The First Wives Club as film producer Bill Atchison, husband of Goldie Hawn's character, Elise Eliot, in 1996.

In 2010, Garber had an uncredited cameo in The Town, directed by Ben Affleck, as a bank manager. Garber also appeared in the film Ice Quake. In late 2012, he appeared in Affleck's film Argo, about the Iran hostage crisis; Garber portrayed Canadian Ambassador to Iran Kenneth D. Taylor. He also co-starred in 2014 thriller Big Game.

He narrated the 2017 film They Shall Not Perish.

Television
On television, he has had roles on American and Canadian shows. Garber's first leading role on television show was in CBS's 1985 summer series I Had Three Wives. He had a recurring guest role on CTV's E.N.G. (1991–93). He portrayed Jack Bristow, the father of main character Sydney Bristow on ABC's Alias, earning three Emmy nominations. He next starred on the television series Justice (2006) on Fox and ABC's Eli Stone. He appeared as Olivier Roth in four episodes of the Canadian science drama ReGenesis. He appeared in the Fox series Glee in the third episode titled "Acafellas", as Will's father. He played Dr. Martin Stein / Firestorm on The Flash beginning in 2015 before being spun off onto Legends of Tomorrow where he was a series regular for two seasons and half of the third. Aside from the two crossovers, Garber made an independent return to The Flash in the season three episode "Duet" as the unnamed husband of gangster Diggsy Foss in the dreamworld scenario. He has also recurred as Admiral Halsey on The Orville.

Personal life
Garber prefers to keep his personal life private and has largely stayed out of the tabloids. In 2012, he referred publicly to being gay. In 2013, he said "I don't really talk about it but everybody knows." Garber has been in a relationship with Canadian artist and model Rainer Andreesen since 2000.  On October 10, 2015, Andreesen announced on his Instagram page that he and Garber were married in Canada. Garber has Type 1 diabetes; he was diagnosed in 1962 at the age of 12.

Garber is good friends with his Alias co-star Jennifer Garner. He and his partner were the only guests at Garner's wedding to Ben Affleck, which he officiated.

Acting credits

Film

Television

Theatre
Source: Playbill

Awards and nominations 
In addition to industry awards, Garber was appointed to the Order of Canada in 2022, with the rank of Officer.

References

External links

 
 
 
 
 
 

1949 births
Living people
20th-century Canadian male actors
20th-century Canadian male singers
21st-century Canadian male actors
21st-century Canadian male singers
21st-century American male singers
20th-century Canadian LGBT people
21st-century Canadian LGBT people
20th-century American LGBT people
21st-century American LGBT people
Audiobook narrators
Canadian emigrants to the United States
Canadian expatriate male actors in the United States
Canadian expatriate musicians in the United States
Canadian male film actors
Canadian folk singers
Canadian male musical theatre actors
Canadian people of Russian-Jewish descent
Canadian male television actors
Canadian male voice actors
Canadian gay actors
Canadian gay musicians
American male film actors
American folk singers
American male musical theatre actors
American people of Canadian descent
American people of Russian-Jewish descent
American male television actors
American male voice actors
American gay actors
Jewish American male actors
Gay Jews
Gay singers
Canadian LGBT singers
Outstanding Performance by a Cast in a Motion Picture Screen Actors Guild Award winners
Male actors from London, Ontario
Musicians from London, Ontario
Male actors from New York City
Musicians from New York City
University of Toronto alumni
People with type 1 diabetes
Officers of the Order of Canada